Akinori Nakagawa 2001–2005 is the second album from Akinori Nakagawa.

Track listing

External links
Official Discography 
JBOOK Data 

Akinori Nakagawa albums
2006 compilation albums